Imprisoned Women (Swedish: Kvinnor i fångenskap) is a 1943 Swedish drama film directed by Olof Molander and starring Gunnar Sjöberg, Elsie Albiin and Gunn Wållgren. It was made at the Centrumateljéerna Studios in Stockholm. The film's sets were designed by the art director Bibi Lindström.

Synopsis
A pastor becomes a prison chaplain and encounters a number of woman inmates each of whom have their own life stories.

Cast
 Gunnar Sjöberg as 	Pastor Brobäck
 Elsie Albiin as 	Mary
 Gunn Wållgren as 	Viola
 Hampe Faustman as 	Roland 
 Barbro Hiort af Ornäs as 	Kaj
 Sigurd Wallén as 	Fängelseläkaren
 Erik Rosén as 	Fängelsedirektören
 Hjördis Petterson as 	Fånge
 Marianne Löfgren as 	Fånge
 Hilda Borgström as 	Fånge
 Vera Valdor as 	Fånge
 Märta Arbin as 	Fånge
 Signe Wirff as 	Föreståndarinnan på skyddshemmet
 Birgitta Arman as 	Flicka på skyddshemmet
 Ninni Löfberg as 	Flicka på skyddshemmet
 Maj-Britt Håkansson as 	Flicka på skyddshemmet 
 Marianne Karlbeck as 	Flicka på skyddshemmet
 Margot Ryding as 	Fru Brobäck
 Carl Barcklind as 	Kyrkoherden
 Nina Scenna as 	Marys mor
 Carl Ström as Violas far
 Olga Appellöf as 	Violas mor 
 Eric Laurent as 	Överkonstapeln 
 Anna-Stina Wåglund as 	Expedit
 Agda Helin as 	Expedit
 Åke Claesson as 	Doctor 
 Eivor Engelbrektsson as 	Office Clerk
 Karl Erik Flens as Roland's Friend 
 Georg Funkquist as 	Otto Winblad 
 Nils Hallberg as 	Fred
 Ingrid Luterkort as 	Policewoman
 Stina Ståhle as Teacher 
 Birger Åsander as 	Angry Man

References

Bibliography 
 Gustafsson, Fredrik. The Man from the Third Row: Hasse Ekman, Swedish Cinema and the Long Shadow of Ingmar Bergman. Berghahn Books, 2016.
 Hjort, Mette & Lindqvist, Ursula. A Companion to Nordic Cinema. John Wiley & Sons, 2016.

External links 
 

1943 films
Swedish drama films
1943 drama films
1940s Swedish-language films
Films directed by Olof Molander
1940s Swedish films